Tamás Buday Jr. (born April 23, 1976) is a Hungarian-born Canadian sprint canoer who competed from 1996 to 2006. He won three silver medals at the ICF Canoe Sprint World Championships (C-2 1000 m: 2006, C-4 1000 m: 2002, 2003) Buday was born in Budapest, Hungary.

Competing in three Summer Olympics, Buday earned his best finish of seventh in the C-2 1000 m event at Sydney in 2000.

Buday's father Tamás won bronze medals in the C-2 500 m and C-2 1000 m events at the 1976 Summer Olympics in Montreal.

References

Real Champions.ca profile
Sports-reference.com profile

1976 births
Living people
Canadian male canoeists
Canoeists at the 1996 Summer Olympics
Canoeists at the 2000 Summer Olympics
Canoeists at the 2004 Summer Olympics
Canadian people of Hungarian descent
Hungarian emigrants to Canada
Naturalized citizens of Canada
Olympic canoeists of Canada
ICF Canoe Sprint World Championships medalists in Canadian